St. Elias Antiochian Orthodox Church is a church of the Antiochian Orthodox Christian Archdiocese of North America located in La Crosse, Wisconsin. It is part of the Diocese of Toledo and the Midwest. The church was founded by Syrian and Lebanese immigrants and named in honor of the Hebrew Prophet Elijah. St. Elias Antiochian Orthodox Church is  one of the oldest churches in La Crosse.

Notes

External links
St. Elias Antiochian Orthodox Church

Buildings and structures in La Crosse, Wisconsin
Eastern Orthodox churches in Wisconsin
Antiochian Orthodox Church in the United States
Churches in La Crosse County, Wisconsin
Lebanese-American history
Syrian-American history